The Argyll Velodrome is an outdoor velodrome in Edmonton, Alberta, Canada.

History
The velodrome was built for the 1978 Commonwealth Games and later also hosted the track cycling competitions at the 1983 Summer Universiade. The velodrome was closed between September 1989 and August 1996. Later it hosted the 2001 National Track Cycling Championships and 2005 World Masters' Games. In September 2007 Edmonton unveiled plans to build a new velodrome to replace the Argyll Velodrome. In October 2012 the city council approved the proposal for an indoor track for the Coronation area.  As of 2020, the indoor facility is still in the design phase and scheduled to open in 2024 at the earliest; the track will be  and made of Siberian pine.

See also

List of Commonwealth Games venues

References

External links
 

Velodromes in Canada
Sports venues in Edmonton
1983 Summer Universiade
1978 Commonwealth Games venues